Gabriel Jarret (born Gabriel Kronsberg; January 1, 1970, Los Angeles, California) is an American actor. He began his career in 1981. He is best known for his role as the young genius Mitch Taylor in the 1985 comedy film Real Genius in which he co-starred with Val Kilmer.

Movie and television
Jarret's first film was Going Ape! in 1981. Arguably his most notable appearance was as Mitch Taylor alongside Val Kilmer's Chris Knight in the movie Real Genius. Other film roles include The Karate Kid Part III, Apollo 13 and Last Days. Jarret also made television guest appearances in such shows as 21 Jump Street, L.A. Law, Party of Five, and The West Wing.

Jarret appeared as 1st Officer Chapman in Poseidon. He performed in the Ron Howard film Frost/Nixon as Nixon speechwriter Ken Khachigian.

Current activities

Jarret is also an American Sign Language (ASL) interpreter and shares his passion for the Deaf community onstage as well. He is a stage actor who has performed with Terrylene in Sweet Nothing in My Ear (Minneapolis, MN) under the Mixed Blood Theatre Company.

Jarret is also a lyricist and vocalist of the rock/alternative rock vein. In the early 1990s, Jarret fronted the Los Angeles-based rock band The Unknown. The band had limited success for a short period, once appearing at the House of Blues with soul great Tower of Power. The band attracted some record label interest, but broke up before any deals materialized.

References

External links

1970 births
American male film actors
American male television actors
Living people
Male actors from Los Angeles
American Sign Language interpreters